Carlos Manuel Oliveira Marques (born 6 February 1983) is a Portuguese former professional footballer who played as a right back or a central defender.

He spent most of his career in Cyprus, arriving in the country in 2007.

Club career
Born in Lisbon, Marques joined local Sporting CP's youth academy at the age of 9. He could never appear for his hometown club's first team, only competing with the reserve side in the third division and being loaned twice.

In 2006, released by the Lions, Marques signed with Ethnikos Piraeus F.C. of the Greek second level. Unsettled, he returned to his country in the following transfer window, joining C.D. Olivais e Moscavide in the second tier, being regularly used during his four-month spell but suffering relegation.

Marques moved to APOP Kinyras FC during the summer of 2007. In November of the following year, he tested positive in a doping test alongside compatriot Lionel Medeiros, following a match against Anorthosis Famagusta FC played on 31 October. The Cyprus Football Association's judiciary committee imposed a one-year ban on the former starting from day he sampled, but eventually took into consideration his cooperation as he showed coach Eduard Eranosyan to be solely responsible for the result; the club decided to keep him and, in May, he helped it win the season's Cypriot Cup.

In early February 2011, Marques changed teams but stayed in the Cypriot First Division, signing for AEL Limassol.

International career
All youth levels comprised, Marques won 43 caps for Portugal and scored once. His only appearance for the under-21s occurred on 17 August 2004, when he played the second half of the 0–0 friendly draw to Malta held in Pedroso, Vila Nova de Gaia.

Club statistics

References

External links

1983 births
Living people
Footballers from Lisbon
Portuguese footballers
Association football defenders
Liga Portugal 2 players
Segunda Divisão players
Sporting CP B players
A.D. Ovarense players
C.F. União players
C.D. Olivais e Moscavide players
Football League (Greece) players
Ethnikos Piraeus F.C. players
Cypriot First Division players
Cypriot Second Division players
APOP Kinyras FC players
AEL Limassol players
Alki Larnaca FC players
Olympiakos Nicosia players
Doxa Katokopias FC players
Pafos FC players
Digenis Akritas Morphou FC players
Portugal youth international footballers
Portugal under-21 international footballers
Portuguese expatriate footballers
Expatriate footballers in Greece
Expatriate footballers in Cyprus
Portuguese expatriate sportspeople in Greece
Portuguese expatriate sportspeople in Cyprus
Nottingham Forest F.C. non-playing staff